Kameshkurye is a rural locality (a village) in Tolshmenskoye Rural Settlement, Totemsky  District, Vologda Oblast, Russia. The population was 16 as of 2002.

Geography 
Kameshkurye is located 75 km south of Totma (the district's administrative centre) by road. Nikolskoye is the nearest rural locality.

References 

Rural localities in Tarnogsky District